Two Royal Norwegian Navy ships and a class of patrol boats have been named Rapp, meaning quick.

  — is named Rapp, but with old spelling. This is the world's first torpedo boat.
  - a 
 The s.
  — The lead ship of the Rapp class.

Royal Norwegian Navy ship names